The La Luz Trail (Trail 137) is a popular hiking trail located on the west face of the Sandia Mountains near Albuquerque, New Mexico. The trail begins at the La Luz Trailhead and proceeds approximately eight miles to either Sandia Crest or the Sandia Peak Tramway. The trail allows hikers to view the flora and fauna of four climatic "life zones" and the granite cliffs and spires native to the west face of the Sandia Mountains. It also offers excellent views of Albuquerque, the cinder cones of the Albuquerque Volcanoes, and Mount Taylor. The La Luz Trail is also home to the La Luz Trail Run.

Location

The La Luz Trail is located in the northwestern part of the Sandia Mountains subrange of the Sandia-Manzano Mountains. It can be accessed from Sandia Crest, the Sandia Peak Tramway, or the La Luz Trailhead. The La Luz Trailhead is accessed by taking the Forest Road 333 turnoff from Tramway Road (NM 556).

Trail information

The lower reaches of the trail are a wide dirt path that climbs at a moderate slope. This part of the trail passes through the Upper Sonoran Zone life zone, where juniper and piñon trees, prickly pear cactus, and cholla cactus are found. About a mile from the trailhead is the junction of La Luz Trail and the Tramway trail. The Tramway trail connects to the lower tram terminal, and allows hikers to use the tram to return to their vehicles instead of hiking the  round trip. As the trail climbs the mountain, the scrub forest is replaced by the alpine forest of the Transition Zone, with ponderosa pines, blue spruce trees, and assorted wildflowers in the summer months. Just past this overlook is a sign that warns hikers that the trail beyond is snowy and impassable in the winter months. The trail becomes narrower and more rocky after the overlook. The trail travels through a steep, rocky draw with the many quaking aspen and pines of the Canadian Zone. Hikers traverse 19 switchbacks in this area as they near the top of the trail. Approximately  from the trailhead in the Hudsonian Zone, the La Luz trail forks.

Trail conditions and precautions

The La Luz trail is a strenuous day hike, especially if hikers are attempting to hike up and down the trail.  Often, hikers will turn around at a set point on the trail or use the tram to only hike one way on the trail.  It is recommended that all hikers be in the appropriate physical condition for their desired trip length, and to take the necessary equipment including severe weather clothing. 

The La Luz trail is well-worn due to the large number of hikers it receives.  However, it is possible to lose the trail, as there have been some relocations of switchbacks.  In the winter months, the area above the  sign is very snowy, and requires snowshoes and trekking poles for passage.  The trail is subject to closure due to extreme fire danger in the hot summer months. The Sandia Ranger District provides a website that has a page of current trail conditions   such as ice and snow.

La Luz Trail run

The La Luz Trail has been the site of a trail race up its slopes since 1965. After the designation of the Sandia Mountain Wilderness area in the 1970s, the race was limited to 400 participants by the Forest Service. These slots are filled by lottery. This run was honored as one of the "12 Most Grueling Trail Races in North America" by the fall 2001 issue of Trail Runner Magazine.

References

External links
La Luz Trail Run

Geography of Bernalillo County, New Mexico
Hiking trails in New Mexico
Transportation in Bernalillo County, New Mexico